UHT is ultra-high-temperature processing (or ultra heat treatment), used to sterilize milk.

UHT or Uht may also refer to:

 Unhextrium, chemical element 163, symbol Uht
 Ultra-high-temperature metamorphism in geology
 United Hebrew Trades, New York, US, 1880s
 Unterstützungshubschrauber Tiger, a variant of Eurocopter Tiger
 The Ukrainian Heraldry Society